Maya is a town in the Faizabad district of the Indian state of Uttar Pradesh, India. Maya is 24 km away from district headquarters Ayodhya city.

Maya Bazar is also a block in Faizabad district  in Uttar Pradesh.

In Dalpatpur Uparhar village, Famous Hathiram Baba Mutt situated for pilgrims who play Dice game with Tirupati Bala Ji.

Demographics
As of the 2011 Census of India, Maya had a population of 19,690. Males constitute 51% of the population and females 49%. Maya has an average literacy rate of 62%, higher than the national average of 59.5%: male literacy is 71%, and female literacy is 52%. In Maya, 17% of the population is under 6 years of age.

Transport

Road
Maya Bazar is well connected with nearby cities Ayodhya and Sultanpur. And also with Goshainganj, Chaure Bazar and Bikapur towns of Faizabad district.

Railway
Goshainganj, Faizabad Junction (Ayodhya Cantt Junction), Ayodhya Junction, Bharatkund and Chaure Bazar are the nearby railway stations from Maya Bazar (Ayodhya).

Air
Ayodhya Airport is the nearest airport to Maya Bazar.

References

 Cities and towns in Faizabad district